Etlingera australasica is a monocotyledonous plant species that was first described by Rosemary Margaret Smith. Etlingera australasica is part of the genus Etlingera and the family Zingiberaceae. No subspecies are listed in the Catalog of Life.

References 

australasica
Taxa named by Rosemary Margaret Smith
Plants described in 1986
Flora of Queensland